Berthold Hatschek (3 April 1854 in Skrbeň – 18 January 1941 in Vienna) was an Austrian zoologist remembered for embryological and morphological studies of invertebrates.

Life
He studied zoology in Vienna under Carl Claus (1835-1899), and in Leipzig with Rudolf Leuckart (1822-1898). He gained his doctorate at the University of Leipzig with a dissertation titled Beiträge zur Entwicklungsgeschichte der Lepidopteren. Hatschek was deeply influenced by the works of Ernst Haeckel (1834-1919).

In 1885 he was appointed professor of zoology at Charles University in Prague, and from 1896 was a professor and director of the second zoological institute at the University of Vienna. Hatschek suffered from severe depression, which greatly affected his work in the latter stages of his life.

Hatschek is remembered for the so-called "trochophore theory", in which he explains the trochophore to be the larval form of a hypothetical organism- the "trochozoon" (which in adult form corresponded to a trochophore-like rotifer, and was the suggested common ancestor of almost all bilateral, metazoan lifeforms). 

In 1888 he split Frey and Leuckart's Coelenterata into three phyla: Spongiaria, Cnidaria and Ctenophora. From his research of amphioxus, the anatomical terms- "Hatschek's pit" and "Hatschek's nephridium" are derived.

Selected writings
 Studien über Entwicklungsgeschichte der Anneliden. Ein Beitrag zur Morphologie der Bilaterien, 1878.
 Studien über entwicklung des Amphioxus, 1881. 
 Lehrbuch der Zoologie : eine morphologische Übersicht des Thierreiches zur Einführung in das Studium dieser Wissenschaft, 1888.
 "The Amphioxus and its development", translated into English, 1893.
 Das acromerit des Amphioxus, 1906.
 Das neue Zoologische System, 1911.

References

1941 deaths
1854 births
Embryologists
Austrian zoologists
Moravian-German people
Academic staff of the University of Vienna
Academic staff of Charles University
People from Olomouc District